222 is the debut extended play (EP) by Argentine singer and songwriter María Becerra. It was released on 11 September 2019 independently, and later distributed by 300 Entertainment.

"Dime cómo hago" was the most successful track on the EP; it entered the Billboard Argentina Hot 100, thus making Becerra's first entry on the list.

Track listing
All tracks are produced by Big One, except where noted.

Personnel
Credits adapted from Genius.

 María Becerra – primary vocals
 Big One – production
 Estani – production

Release history

References

2019 EPs
María Becerra albums
Spanish-language EPs